Mass media in the Democratic Republic of the Congo are both nationally and internationally state owned and operated.

Freedom of speech and the press

While the constitution provides for freedom of speech and the press, the government has restricted this right in practise. Arrests, murders and other harassment of journalists is frequently reported.

In 2009, the freedom of the press global ranking released each year by Reporters Without Borders ranked the Democratic Republic of the Congo at 146 out of 175 countries.

There are several organizations monitoring freedom of the press in the Democratic Republic of the Congo:
 Union nationale de la presse congolaise
 Journaliste en danger

"Coupage" 
Many journalists in the Democratic Republic of the Congo are subjected to the practise of coupage (in English: cutting), where journalists are paid to write articles on behalf of persons who are the article's actual subject. Press independence remains stifled. There are two significant impacts from this practise: 
 it affects the principle of remuneration of some journalists, enabling the Congolese print media to make it difficult for journalists to earn a living from legitimate journalism alone;
 it makes it easier to bribe the press, as much for partisan articles as for articles containing generally neutral information.

Print

Major newspapers are only nominally privately owned. Journalists must be members of the state-controlled union to practise their profession. The press today is firmly under MPR control. The largest dailies were Elima, Courrier d’Afrique, and Salongo (fr) (10,000).

The majority of print press publications are in French, an official language of the country. Despite their ambitions of national news coverage, it is difficult for these publications to attain broad coverage, both due to challenges in gathering information, and in physically distributing the publications. Many journalists are therefore tied to a city or a region, essentially Kinshasa.

Several daily newspapers are published, of which the majority have a pro-government bias. Some newspapers are published irregularly.

Print publications
Daily publications

Bi-Weekly publications

Weekly publications

Telecommunications

The postal, telephone, and telegraph services are owned and operated by the government. In 2002 there were an estimated 10,000 mainline phones in use nationwide. In 2003 there were an estimated 19 cell phones in use for every 1,000 people. State-controlled radio and television transmissions, operated under Radio-Television Nationale Congolaise (RTNC), are the prominent broadcasting stations, reaching the largest number of citizens. The RTNC radio broadcast of La Voix du Congo, is available in French, Swahili, Lingala, Tshiluba, and Kikongo. There are also many privately run broadcasting stations. In 2001, there were 3 AM and 11 FM radio stations and 4 television stations. In 2003, there were an estimated 385 radios and 2 television sets for every 1,000 people.

Television
Since 1990 many television stations have been broadcasting in the Democratic Republic of the Congo. In 2006, 58 television channels were available. Of these, 38 are in Kinshasa.

Television stations

 Action Missionnaire d'Évangélisation des nations TV
 Africa TV
 Antenne A, à Kinshasa
 Canal Congo Télévision (CC TV)
 Canal Kin Télévision (CKTV)
 Canal Tropical Télévision (Tropicana TV)
 Congo Education Broadcasting System (CEBS)
 Couleurs Télévision
 Congo Web TV
 CMB TV
 Musique Various & Le T.P. O.K. Jazz
 Digital Congo TV
 GKV Network Television (GKV) in Mbanza-Ngungu, Lower Congo
 Global TV
 Horizon 33
 Mirador TV
 Numerica
 Nyota TV, in Lubumbashi, Katanga
 Nzondo TV
 Planète TV
 Radio Télé Puissance (RTP)
 Radio Télévision Armée de l'Éternel
 Radio Télévision de la Voix de l'Aigle
 Radio Télévision Dieu Vivant (RTDV)
 Radio Television Groupe Avenir (RTG@)
 Radio-Télévision Kasangulu (RTKAS), in Kasangulu, Bas-Congo
 Radio Télévision Kimbanguiste
 Radio Télévision Kintuadi
 Radio Télévision Wantanshi (RTW)
 Radio Télévision Message de Vie (RTMV)
 Radio-Télévision nationale congolaise (RTNC) : RTNC1, RTNC2, RTNC3, RTNC4, RTNC Bandundu, etc.
 Radio Télévision Nyota (RTN)
 Radio Télévision Sango Malamu
 Radio Télévision Sentinelle
 Raga TV, Raga+
 Solar Energy
 Télévision Kin Malebo
 Télé France Kinshasa : www.tfktv.com
 Radio Télé Mwangaza in Lubumbashi, Katanga

Radio and radio stations 
The Democratic Republic of the Congo has many radio stations, the majority of which are based in Kinshasa. The transitional Constitution installed an entity called Haute autorité des Medias (HAM), which oversees media activity, including radio broadcasting.

It is estimated that 60% of broadcasts are in the four national languages: (Kikongo, Lingala, Swahili, Tshiluba).  The rest are in French and, rarely, in English.

Public stations
 RTNC, national radio with regional broadcasts

Humanitarian stations
 Radio Okapi, national coverage with regional broadcasts

Community stations
 Radio Réveil FM, in Kinshasa and Radio Reveil Afrika in Lubumbashi
 Radio Communautaire de Muanda (RCM), in Muanda
 Radio Communautaire de Mbanza Ngungu (Radio NTEMO), in Mbanza Ngungu
 Radio Evangélique de Muanda (RTEM), in Muanda
 Radio Télé Boma (RTB), in Boma
 Radio Osase, in Tshumbe (Kasai)
 Radio Bangu (rb) in Kimpese
 Radio Ntomotosono in Luozi
 Radio Adri à Madimba
 Radio Maendeleo in Bukavu
 Radio Bubusa FM in Mugogo/ Walungu

Private stations
 Canal Futur, in Kinshasa
 Concorde FM, in Kasai
 Digital Congo FM, in Kinshasa
 GKV Network Television (GKV) in the process of being installed in Mbanza-Ngungu
 La Voix du Peuple, in Bunia
 Radio Bukavu, in Bukavu
 Radio Kisangani, in Kisangani
 Radio Malebo Broadcast Channel (MBC), in Kinshasa
 Radio Mbuji-Mayi, in Mbuji-Mayi
 Radio Mwangaza, in Lubumbashi
 Radio Liberté Kinshasa, in Kinshasa
 Radio Lubumbashi, in Lubumbashi
 Radio Télé Groupe L'Avenir (RTGA), in Kinshasa
 Radio Télévision Catholique Elikya (RTCE)
 Radio-Télévision Kasangulu (RTKAS), in Kasangulu
 Radio Télé Kin Malebo (RTKM), in Kinshasa
 Radio Télé Nyota, in Lubumbashi
 Raga FM, in Kinshasa
 Top Congo FM, in Kinshasa
 Radio Télé Matadi (RTM) in Matadi
 Radio Télé Kisantu (RTKIS) in Kisantu
 RadioTélé Débout Ksai (RTDK) in Mbujimayi
 Radio télé Kasai Horison (KHrt) in Mbujimayi

Religious stations
 Elikya, à Kinshasa
 Radio Canal CVV ("Le Chemin, la Vérité et la Vie"), in Kinshasa
 Radio ECC, in Kinshasa
 Radio Kintuadi, in Kinshasa and in Lower Congo, in Matadi, Boma, Mbanza Ngungu
 Radio Kahuzi, in Bukavu
 Radio Lumière, in Kinshasa
 Radio Méthodiste Lokole, in Kinshasa
 Radio Parole Éternelle, in Kinshasa
 Radio Sango Malamu, in Boma, Kikwit and Kinshasa
 Radio Sentinelle, in Kinshasa
 Radio Sumbula, in Kinshasa
 Radio Télé Armée de l'Éternel, in Kinshasa
 Radio Télé Message de Vie, in Kinshasa
 Radio Télé Puissance, in Kinshasa
 Radio Télévision Dieu Vivant, in Kinshasa
 Radio Télévision Kimbanguiste (RATELKI), in Kinshasa
 Radio Universelle, in Kinshasa
 Radio Vuvu Kieto in Mbanza Ngungu
 Radio Télé Mont Carmel, in Mbujimayi
 Radio Télé Sentinnelle, in Mbujimayi
 Radio Télévision EELDA, in Mbujimayi
 Radio Télévision Bwena Muntu, in Mbujimayi

See also
Telecommunications in the Democratic Republic of the Congo
 Democratic Republic of the Congo literature
  
 Cinema of the Democratic Republic of the Congo

References

Bibliography

External links
 
 

 
Congo, Democratic
Congo, Democratic